The Islamic Solidarity Games is a multinational, multi-sport event. The Games involve the elite athletes of the Organisation of Islamic Cooperation who compete in a variety of sports. The Solidarity Games were initially created to strengthen Islamic camaraderie and reinforce the values of Islam, primarily to the youth. The Islamic Solidarity Sports Federation (ISSF) and the Organization of the Islamic Cooperation (OIC) is the organization that is responsible for the direction and control of the Islamic Solidarity Games. The ISSF strives to improve Islamic solidarity, promote Islamic identity in sports and help reduce discrimination toward Muslims.

History
The original idea for the Solidarity Games comes from Prince Faisal bin Fahd bin Abdulaziz, during the Third Islamic Summit in 1981. The first Solidarity games was held in 2005 in Saudi Arabia and there are currently 57 members of the Organisation of the Islamic Conference. In 2005, the games were male-only with 7,000 athletes from fifty-four countries competing in thirteen different sports. Females are now allowed to participate in the games but compete on different days than men.  Non-Muslim citizens in the member countries are also allowed to take part in the Games.  It was said to have the most participants for a sporting event aside from the Olympic Games.

A second event, originally scheduled to take place in October 2009 in Iran, and later rescheduled for April 2010, was canceled after a dispute arose between Iran and the Arab World over the use of the term Persian Gulf in logos for the Games, as some countries in the Arab world use the term "Arabian Gulf" instead. Dispute over the name has been a recurring source of disharmony between Arab states and Iran. The latest edition took place in Baku, on 12–22 May 2017.

With the level of political fragmentation, the deficiencies in economic development in many Muslim countries, and the financial cost of the Islamic Solidarity games, the longevity of the games will be a big challenge.

‌The 2021 Islamic Solidarity Games were the 5th edition of the event. It was the first time that the event was organised by the Turkish Olympic Committee. Scheduled to take place in 2021, the event was postponed to be held in 2022, because the original dates were coinciding with the 2020 Summer Olympics, which were postponed due to the COVID-19 pandemic.

The 2025 Islamic Solidarity Games will be the first ever not to be hosted in a Muslim majority country. The elected host city, Yaoundé, is the capital of Cameroon, where the Christian population exceeds 70% of the population, while around 25% is Muslim. Cameroon is a member of the Organisation of Islamic Cooperation.

Editions

Sports 
28 sports have been presented in the Islamic Solidarity Games.

Medal count

See also
Islamic Games
Women's Islamic Games
Maccabiah Games

References

External links

 
Multi-sport events
Recurring sporting events established in 2005